is a 143 m (469 ft) tall office skyscraper in Tokyo, Japan. At 38 stories the building is the 86th tallest building in Tokyo. It contains 1.4 million sq ft (134,974 m²) of office space, 100% of which is now occupied by Mizuho Bank, the consumer banking arm of the second-largest Japanese financial conglomerate Mizuho Financial Group, while still called the DKB Head Office from time to time.

The building was built in Chiyoda at 1 Uchisaiwaichō in 1981, when it was called the Dai-Ichi Kangyo Bank Head Office Building. It was designed by architects Yoshinobu Ashihara & Partners and developed by Shimizu Corporation, one of the “big five” real estate developers in Japan. Dai-Ichi Kangyo Bank (“DKB”) combined with Fuji Bank and the Industrial Bank of Japan in 2000 to form Mizuho Financial Group.

The building was closed prior to its demolition.

References

External links 
 Shimizu Corporation Project Gallery
 Mizuho Bank Head Office Building, Tokyo (Emporis)

Bank Head Office Building, Tokyo
Skyscraper office buildings in Tokyo
Shimizu Corporation

Office buildings completed in 1980
Demolished buildings and structures in Japan